The North York Board of Education (NYBE, commonly known as School District 13), officially the Board of Education for the City of North York is the former public school board for the former city of North York in Ontario, Canada.

In 1998, the provincial Government of Ontario passed legislation which amalgamated North York into the City of Toronto. As part of the amalgamation process, the NYBE ceased to exist. Today, administration of schools in North York is handled by the Toronto District School Board. The NYBE building was located at 5050 Yonge Street, in the same complex as Mel Lastman Square, the former North York City Hall. This building now houses the Toronto District School Board offices.

Schools
North York operated various elementary, junior high, and secondary schools along with its alternative programs.

Elementary schools

Secondary schools

 Avondale Alternative Secondary School
 A. Y. Jackson Secondary School
 Bathurst Heights Secondary School
 Nelson A. Boylen Collegiate Institute
 Downsview Secondary School
 Drewry Secondary School
 Emery Collegiate Institute
 Sir Sandford Fleming Academy
 Earl Haig Secondary School
 George S. Henry Academy
 C. W. Jefferys Collegiate Institute
 William Lyon Mackenzie Collegiate Institute
 Don Mills Collegiate Institute
 Newtonbrook Secondary School
 Northview Heights Secondary School
 Victoria Park Collegiate Institute
 Westview Centennial Secondary School
 York Mills Collegiate Institute
 Yorkdale Secondary School

French-language schools
Previously the district operated two French-language schools in addition to English-language schools. As of May 1980 the district operated two of the seven public French-language schools in Metropolitan Toronto, with the other five being operated by the Metropolitan Separate School Board (now the Toronto Catholic District School Board). The North York school board required that a potential student must know French before being admitted to a French-speaking school. The Conseil des écoles françaises de la communauté urbaine de Toronto (CEFCUT) assumed control of French-language education in the Toronto area on 1 December 1988.

In 1977 the school board voted to build a school out of surplus portable buildings on the site of the Ecole Etienne Brule, spending $120,000 to construct the school. At nighttime, when workers tried to move the portables onto the site, some residents tried to obstruct their efforts.

References

External links

North York Board of Education (Archive)
Website of current Toronto District School Board

Education in Toronto
Former school districts in Ontario
1998 disestablishments in Ontario